Mazovo may refer to:

Mazovo, Tver Oblast, a village in Tver Oblast, Russia
Mazovo, name of several other rural localities in Russia